Brain Island is an island at the north side of Husvik Harbor, in Stromness Bay, South Georgia. It was charted and named by DI personnel in 1928.

See also 
 List of Antarctic and sub-Antarctic islands

References
 

Islands of South Georgia